Shree Banshidhar Nagar, also known as Nagar Unntari, is one of the administrative block in Garhwa district, Jharkhand state, India. It is located 40 km towards west from District headquarters Garhwa in Bhawanathpur Bidhansabha. 
Shree Banshidhar Nagar is surrounded by states Uttar Pradesh, Chhattisgarh  and Bihar.

Ranchi is the state capital of it which is located around 212.5 km away.

This place is famous for Baba Shree Bansidhar and Raja Pahari . Shree Banshidhar temple contains century old gold statue of Radha-Krishna and Raja Pahari(Shiva Temple) located at the Top of a Hill.

Geography 

Shree Banshidhar Nagar lies between 23°50′ and 24°8′ north latitude and between 83°55′ and 84°30′ east longitude. It is bordered on the north by Bihar and on the east by the Palamu district, on the south by Chhattisgarh and on the west by Uttar Pradesh.
This covers an area of 5043.8 km² and has a population of 46079 approximately.
The surrounding nearby villages and its distance from Shree Banshidhar Nagar are Kushdand 0.4 km, Chitvishram 1.5 km,
Tharakiya 6 km, Puraini 1.6 km, Jangipur 3.4 km, Bhojpur 3.7 km, Garbandh 7.2 km, Bilaspur 7.8 km.
The following table shows other railway stations and its distance from Shree banshidhar nagar Untari. 
 Wyndhamganj   - 10.4 km.
 Ramna	     - 11.7 km.
 Mahuariya     - 20.4 km
 Meralgram     - 23.2 km.
 Garhwa 	     - 33.9 km.
 Garhwa Road      - 48.7 km.
 Ranchi     - 243.8 km.

The other nearest state capitals are Lucknow, Patna and Raipur. Shree Banshidhar Nagar is a village panchayat located in the Garhwa district of Jharkhand state, India. The latitude 24.28 and longitude 83.50 are the geocoordinate of the Shree Banshidhar Nagar. Distance of  Lucknow from here is 258.5 km. The other surrounding state capitals are Patna 221.4 km, Lucknow 385.9 km, Bhubaneswar 507.1 km.

History 

Shree Banshidhar Nagar (earlier named as Nagar Untari) is a Royal estate which was once ruled by the Deo Family. Bhaiya Rudra Pratap Deo was the last ruler to have ruled the place. Bhaiya Shankar pratap deo Son of Bhaiya Rudra Pratap Deo has 5 sons (Bade Raja) Raj Rajendra Pratap Deo, Dharmendra Pratap Deo, Mahendra Pratap Deo, Birender Pratap Deo and (Chote Raja) Anant Pratap Deo. Bhaiya Shankar Pratap Deo was a former minister in government of Bihar and multiple times member of legislative assembly. The family owns a magnificent Palace in the city which is very near to shree Bansidhar mandir and is a sight to view. The family still stays in the Palace and are actively involved in the state politics.

According to 2011 census Shree Banshidhar Nagar has population of 49050. It has a population density of 352 inhabitants per square kilometre (1,440/sq mi). Its population growth rate over the decade 2001–11 was 28.9%. It has  sex ratio of 987 females for every 1000 males, and a literacy rate of 42.13%.

Languages
Languages spoken here Hindi, include Asuri, an Austroasiatic language spoken by approximately 17,000 in India, largely in the southern part of Palamu; and Bhojpuri, a tongue in the Bihari language group with almost 40 000 000 speakers, written in both the Devanagari and Kaithi scripts.

Festivals

 Durga Puja
 Deepawali
 Holi
 Chhath Puja
 Ram Navami
 Id-ul fitr
 Eid al-Adha
 Moharram
 Rakhi
 Basant Panchami
 Makar Sankranti
 Shri Krishna Janmastmi

Facilities
Market:   A small market called as Nagar bazar is situated in middle of the block.
Railway Station   Nagar Untari is a famous railway station connected to Gahrwa and Renukoot central government approved to rename this railway station on name of Lord Shri Krishna as Shree Banshidhar Nagar railway station .
Hospital  Trauma Centre Hospital Shree Banshidhar Nagar is one of the famous hospital at Shree Banshidhar Nagar.

Tourists Attractions

Sukhaldari:   This is a beautiful Waterfall located in Dhurki, Shree Banshidhar Nagar. Many People comes here for bath in Festivals.
It is specially known for "Makar Sankranti" festival.
 Shree Banshidhar Temple: This is a very old "Radha-Krishna" temple. This temple contains Gold Statues of God.This is also an attractive place to visit in Shree banshidhar nagar.

See also
Garhwa district
Palamu district
Jharkhand

References

Garhwa district
Community development blocks in Jharkhand
Community development blocks in Garhwa district
Cities and towns in Garhwa district